Café liégeois is a French cold dessert made from lightly sweetened coffee, coffee-flavoured ice cream and chantilly cream.

Refrigerate a large glass filled with the required amount of sweetened coffee, and add the ice cream and chantilly just prior to serving. Often crushed roasted coffee beans are put on top of the chantilly as decoration.

History 
Contrary to its name, the café liégeois dessert did not originate in or around Liège, Belgium. It was originally known in France as a café viennois (French for "Viennese coffee"). However, during World War I, the Battle of Liège took place, which lasted much longer than the German army had anticipated it would, caused a delay in German advances towards France in 1914, allowing the French to reorganize better. In order to honor the city of Liège for its resistance, and because the city was shelled with guns from Austria (an ally of the invading Germany during the war), Paris' cafés started renaming the dessert from café viennois to café liégeois. In Liège itself, the dessert continued to be known as café viennois for a while. and in Swiss French it remains only known as café viennois.

See also
 List of coffee dishes

References

liégeois
Frozen desserts
Ice cream